Boerhavia is a genus of over 100 species in the Nyctaginaceae family. The genus was named for Herman Boerhaave, a Dutch botanist, and the genus name is frequently misspelled "Boerhaavia". Common names include spiderlings and hogweeds.

Taxonomy
There are over 100 species in the genus Boerhavia, which is in the family Nyctaginaceae, which includes the four o'clock flower.

The genus was named for the Dutch botanist Herman Boerhaave, and often misspelt as "Boerhaavia". Common names include spiderlings and hogweeds.

Description
Some species are annuals and others perennials. In habit they generally are herbaceous.

"Spiderling" refers to the appearance of those species that bear inflorescences on numerous long, slender stems, interlocking in a manner suggestive of a spider or spider's web.

Boerhavia species generally are native to warm tropical regions.

Significance
Several species of Boerhavia are of importance as agricultural and horticultural weeds. Some are valued as forage for grazing livestock, and some, such as Boerhavia erecta, also are of use as human food and folk medicine.

Selected species
Boerhavia anisophylla Torr. – wineflower 
Boerhavia boissieri
Boerhavia coccinea P.Mill. – scarlet spiderling 
Boerhavia coulteri (Hook.f.) S.Wats. - Coulter spiderling, Coulter's spiderling 
Boerhavia diffusa L. – red spiderling 
Boerhavia dominii Meikle & Hewson – tah-vine
Boerhavia elegans  
Boerhavia erecta L. – erect spiderling 
Boerhavia gracillima Heimerl – slim-stalk spiderling, slimstalk spiderling 
Boerhavia herbstii Fosberg – alena 
Boerhavia intermedia M.E.Jones – five-wing spiderling, fivewing spiderling
Boerhavia linearifolia Gray – narrowleaf spiderling 
Boerhavia mathisiana F.B.Jones – Mathis' spiderling 
Boerhavia megaptera Standl. – annual spiderling, Tucson Mountain spiderling 
Boerhavia pterocarpa S.Wats. – Apache Pass spiderling 
Boerhavia purpurascens Gray – purple spiderling 
Boerhavia repens L.
Boerhavia scandens L. – climbing spiderling, climbing wartclub, wishbone vine 
Boerhavia spicata Choisy – creeping spiderling
 Boerhavia tetrandra G.Forst. Range: Lord Howe Island, Pacific islands, New South Wales, Queensland, Polynesia, Micronesia. Native names across the Pacific Islands include runa, paikea, tiale katuli, tiare katuri, katuri, naunau, and momoe. Found on Bramble Cay in the Torres Strait, and eaten as a type of spinach by humans.
Boerhavia triquetra S.Wats. – slender spiderling 
Boerhavia wrightii Gray – Wright's boerhavia

Gallery

References

 
Caryophyllales genera